
Gmina Sułoszowa is a rural gmina (administrative district) in Kraków County, Lesser Poland Voivodeship, in southern Poland.

Villages
The gmina contains the villages of Sułoszowa, Wielmoża and Wola Kalinowska.

Neighbouring gminas
Gmina Sułoszowa is bordered by the gminas of Jerzmanowice-Przeginia, Olkusz, Skała and Trzyciąż.

References
Polish official population figures 2006

Suloszowa
Kraków County